Mariam C. Said is an American writer and activist.

Biography

Mariam C. Said was born and raised in Beirut, Lebanon to parents who were of Lebanese and Palestinian origin. She holds an undergraduate degree from the American University of Beirut (AUB) in Lebanon and two graduate degrees from Columbia University. For more than 20 years, she worked in the financial services industry in New York City.

In 2009, Said published the critically acclaimed memoir, A World I Loved: The Story of an Arab Woman, by her mother Wadad Makdisi Cortas. Said collaborated with Vanessa Redgrave to conceive and create a theatre production based on the memoir. The success of its premiere at the Brighton Festival in 2012 led to a performance at the Miller Theatre in New York. In July 2015, the production will be seen at the Spoleto Festival in Italy.

Education activities

Said serves on the board of The Barenboim-Said Music Centre Ramallah, Palestine. Currently, she is on the advisory board of The Freedom Theatre in Jenin, Palestine, and ArteEast, a New York-based international non-profit organization that supports and promotes artists from the Middle East and its Diasporas. In addition, Said is a founding member of the board of the American-Arab Anti-Discrimination Committee and served on the board of directors of the Alumni Association of North America of the American University of Beirut. She is also a member of the Board of Trustees of Americans for Children of the Middle East, which works with its partner organization United Lebanon Youth Project (ULYP) on the BRIDGE program in its efforts to provide scholarships and university placements to bright young Palestinians from the Palestinian refugee camps in Lebanon.

West-Eastern Divan Orchestra & Barenboim-Said Academy

In recognition of her dedication to the continuing success of the WEDO, Said received an honorary doctorate from the Universidad Nacional de Tres de Febrero Buenos Aires, Argentina in 2014. In a 2012 interview with the Wiener Zeitung she described the philosophy of the WEDO and the BSA as follows:
“Think of the principle of counterpoint: single voices are recognized as independent objects. The final result is harmony on a higher level. We are not a political, but a cultural and humanitarian project. Understanding is the start to reduce mistrust. We are the microcosm of a society that does not exist yet.”

Relevant publications and interviews
 "Mariam Said on the West-Eastern Divan Orchestra." PBS NewsHour, February 5, 2013: 
 "Zeitgenossen. Mariam C. Said." Wiener Zeitung, September 28, 2013 
 "The World That Mariam Said Loved. Edward Said's Widow Collaborates With Vanessa Redgrave." Forward, December 15, 2012: 
 "Welcoming address by Mariam Said at the Edward Said Memorial Conference", April 15, 2013, Centre for the Humanities at Utrecht University: 
 Interview with Ricardo Karam, April 4, 2014  
 Wadad Makdisi Cortas: “A World I Loved”. Edited by Mariam C. Said, with a foreword by Nadine Gordimer. New York 2009: Nation Books. 
 Mariam C. Said: “Barenboim-Said Foundation does not promote normalization.” Electronic Intifada, March 17, 2010.  
 Mariam C. Said: Foreword, in: Edward W. Said. "On Late Style. Music and Literature Against the Grain." New York: Pantheon Books, 2006.

References

Year of birth missing (living people)
Living people
American political writers
Postcolonial literature
American humanists
American activists
American writers of Lebanese descent
American University of Beirut alumni
Columbia University alumni
Said family